The women's 200 metres competition at the 2006 Asian Games in Doha, Qatar was held on 10 and 11 December 2006 at the Khalifa International Stadium.

Schedule
All times are Arabia Standard Time (UTC+03:00)

Records

Results 
Legend
DNS — Did not start

1st round 
 Qualification: First 2 in each heat (Q) and the next 2 fastest (q) advance to the final.

Heat 1 
 Wind: +0.9 m/s

Heat 2 
 Wind: +0.4 m/s

Heat 3 
 Wind: +0.9 m/s

Final 
 Wind: −0.7 m/s

References

External links 
Results – 1st Round Heat 1
Results – 1st Round Heat 2
Results – 1st Round Heat 3
Results – Final

Athletics at the 2006 Asian Games
2006